The Asymptotical World EP is an EP by experimental musician Yves Tumor, released by Warp on July 15, 2021. It follows on the heels of their acclaimed 2020 album Heaven to a Tortured Mind. 

The EP was recorded and produced alongside longtime collaborator Yves Rothman, as well as a new partner in multi-instrumentalist Chris Greatti. Musically, it dives deeper into their experimental rock tendencies, as well as the glam-infused sounds of its predecessor.

Composition
The EP's songs take on nu gaze and shoegazing sounds, as well as pulling from 2000s alternative music, dream pop, glam rock and goth rock. It has also been noted for pushing forward in Tumor's experimental rock and donning "maximalist neo-psychedelic texture". It is also seen as an "artful" fusion of industrial music and nu metal.

Opener "Jackie" digs into "heat-sick" psychedelic rock, being compared to the work of duo A.R. Kane and quartet My Bloody Valentine. "Rip-roaring" pop-punk kicks in on "Crushed Velvet". The hypnagogic pop of "Secrecy..." leads into a "Prince-meets-Ariel Pink scenario" and features a "post-punk bass throb".

Critical reception

Upon its release, The Asympototical World was welcomed with mostly positive reviews. Emeka Okonkwo for Resident Advisor called it "dazzling" and its songs "emotional, out-of-this-world love songs".

Track listing

Personnel
All credits adapted from the EP's credits website.

References  

2021 EPs
Warp (record label) EPs
Yves Tumor albums